Syb van der Ploeg (born 15 June 1966) is a Dutch singer and songwriter.

Career 

He was the lead vocalist for the song "Ruthless Queen" released in the 2000 album Close to the Fire by the Dutch progressive rock band Kayak. In 2000, he also played the role of JP in the film De Fûke.

He participated in the 2010 edition of the television show De beste zangers van Nederland.

In 2011, he also played the role of Jesus in the first edition of The Passion.

In 2017, he played a role in that year's Sinterklaasjournaal.

References

External links
 

1966 births
Living people
Dutch male singers
21st-century Dutch male actors
Dutch male singer-songwriters
Dutch singer-songwriters
Place of birth missing (living people)